The 25th Annual Tony Awards ceremony was held on March 28, 1971, at the Palace Theatre in New York City. The ceremony was broadcast by ABC television. Hosts were Lauren Bacall, Angela Lansbury, Anthony Quayle and Anthony Quinn.

The ceremony
The theme was to show highlights from 25 years of musicals that had won Tonys, and the stars who introduced them. The show opened with "What's Happening at the Palace". The presenters were Dick Cavett, Carol Channing and Ruby Keeler.

Saluting 25 Years of Tony Award-Winning Musicals:

 Finian's Rainbow ("When I'm Not Near the Girl I Love" - David Wayne)
 High Button Shoes ("Papa, Wont You Dance with Me?" - Nanette Fabray)
 Kiss Me, Kate ("Where is the Life That Late I Led?" - Alfred Drake)
 South Pacific ("There Is Nothing Like a Dame" - Ray Walston and Company)
 Guys and Dolls ("Adelaide's Lament" - Vivian Blaine)
 The King and I ("Shall We Dance?" - Patricia Morrison and Yul Brynner)
 Wonderful Town ("It's Love" - Edie Adams)
 Kismet ("The Olive Tree" - Alfred Drake)
 Can-Can
 The Pajama Game ("Hey There" - John Raitt)
 Damn Yankees ("Whatever Lola Wants" - Gwen Verdon)
 My Fair Lady ("Get Me to the Church on Time" - Stanley Holloway and Company)
 The Music Man ("Ya Got Trouble" - Robert Preston and Company)
 Redhead

 Fiorello! ("The Name's La Guardia" - Tom Bosley and Company)
 The Sound of Music ("The Sound of Music" - Florence Henderson)
 Bye Bye Birdie ("Kids" - Paul Lynde)
 How to Succeed in Business Without Really Trying ("I Believe in You" - Robert Morse)
 A Funny Thing Happened on the Way to the Forum ("Comedy Tonight" - Zero Mostel)
 Hello, Dolly! ("Before the Parade Passes By" - Carol Channing)
 Fiddler on the Roof ("If I Were A Rich Man" - Zero Mostel)
 Mame ("Open A New Window" - Angela Lansbury)
 Man of La Mancha ("The Impossible Dream (The Quest)" - Richard Kiley)
 Cabaret ("Cabaret" - Jill Haworth)
 Hallelujah, Baby! ("Now's the Time") - Leslie Uggams)
 1776 ("Yours, Yours, Yours" - William Daniels and Virginia Vestoff)
 Applause

The finale was "There's No Business Like Show Business" sung by the entire company.

The performers: Edie Adams, Lauren Bacall, Vivian Blaine, Tom Bosley, Yul Brynner, Carol Channing, William Daniels, Alfred Drake, Nanette Fabray, Jill Haworth, Florence Henderson, Stanley Holloway, Richard Kiley, Angela Lansbury, Paul Lynde, Patricia Morison, Robert Morse, Zero Mostel, Robert Preston, John Raitt, Leslie Uggams, Gwen Verdon, Virginia Vestoff, Ray Walston, David Wayne.

Winners and nominees
Winners are in bold

Special awards
Elliot Norton, drama critic, for distinguished theatrical commentary.
Ingram Ash, president of Blaine-Thompson Advertising, for decades of devoted service to the theatre.
Playbill, for chronicling Broadway through the years.
Roger L. Stevens

Multiple nominations and awards

These productions had multiple nominations:

14 nominations: Company 
9 nominations: The Rothschilds6 nominations: No, No, Nanette5 nominations: Home and The Me Nobody Knows 3 nominations: Paul Sills' Story Theatre, The Philanthropist, The School for Wives and Sleuth 2 nominations: Abelard and Heloise, And Miss Reardon Drinks A Little, Father's Day, Les Blancs, Lovely Ladies, Kind Gentlemen and A Midsummer Night's DreamThe following productions received multiple awards.6 wins: Company 4 wins: No, No, Nanette 2 wins: Paul Sills' Story Theatre and The Rothschilds''

References

External links
Tony Awards Official Site

Tony Awards ceremonies
1971 in theatre
1971 awards
1971 awards in the United States
1971 in New York City
1970s in Manhattan